Dowsing may refer to:

 Dowsing, a method that attempts to locate ground water or other buried materials
 William Dowsing, an English iconoclast who lived during the 17th century
 Dowsing (band), an emo band from Chicago, Illinois
 Dowsing (horse), a Thoroughbred racehorse

Dowse may refer to:
 Dowse (surname), a family name
 Dowse Art Museum, in Lower Hutt, New Zealand

See also 
 Dousing, the practice of making something or someone wet by throwing liquid over them